"Birthday" is a song by American R&B singer K. Michelle, for her fourth studio album "Kimberly: The People I Used to Know" (2017). The song was released on September 8, 2017, through Atlantic Records.

Background and release
Speaking on the track Michelle stated in an interview with Billboard magazine "Birthday is just the fun song going out, but I can honestly say this is my best vocal album and you will get those in ballads like "Brain On Love" and "No Not You". That speaks to who I am and the person and the woman that I’ve become. So I just say it's a little piece on this roller coaster journey that the album takes you in."

Critical reception
The song gained positive reviews from critics. 
HotNewHipHop gave the track a positive review rating it a 3.7 out of 5 stars stating "Heavy enough for the club but slow enough for the bedroom, "Birthday" starts out as an aqueous R&B track akin to Rihanna's "Needed Me." However, K has some tricks up her sleeve; intensifying her vocal delivery as the song progresses, moving from a cooed approach to a more rhythmic, but still half-sung second verse." Vibe praised the song stating "The song, which is the second single from the forthcoming Kimberly: The People I Used to Know, is perfect for both the club scene and the bedroom, as K. provides smooth, sultry vocals that later transition into a rap that brings major vibes." Rap-Up stated "On the seductive “Birthday,” the Memphis songstress caters to her man. After rolling an L and pouring a drink, K gets right. “Come on eat this cake, it’s your birthday,”".

Music video
"Birthday" was directed by Art by Child in, October 25, 2017.

Formats and track listings
Explicit digital download
 "Birthday" – 4:01

Clean digital download
 "Birthday" – 4:01

Release history

References

Songs about birthdays
Songs about birthday parties
2017 songs
2017 singles
K. Michelle songs
Atlantic Records singles
Songs written by Sonyae Elise
Songs written by K. Michelle